Tané M. McClure (born June 8, 1958), sometimes credited as Tahnee Cain and Tané Cain, is an American former actress and singer.

Biography
McClure was born in Los Angeles County, California. She is the daughter of actor Doug McClure and Faye Brash, the first of his five wives. She has a half-sister, Valerie, from her father's marriage to his fourth wife, Diane Soldani, in the 1970s.

McClure made a cameo appearance on her father's Western television series The Virginian at age five. 
Raised in Hawaii, McClure moved to Northern California and, at age 17, began singing in a Latin jazz band called Sweet Honesty. 
She recorded her first single, "Redwood City", in the late 1970s, and soon thereafter met The Babys and Journey keyboardist Jonathan Cain, whom she married.

Moving with him to Los Angeles, she landed a record deal in 1982 and released a self-titled (using her married name Tané Cain) album on RCA Records. A Billboard review of the album described her as "an artist to watch" and remarked that she "looks incredibly beautiful on the LP cover. Then you put it on and find out that she can sing just as well." 
Allmusic's Alex Henderson wrote that "the material – most of it sleek, commercial pop/rock that was co-produced and co-written by Jonathan Cain and has a Pat Benatar-ish quality – is generally excellent."

McClure disliked comparisons to Benatar, preferring to identify herself with her idol Grace Slick. The album's first single, "Danger Zone", failed to chart, but the follow-up, "Holdin' On", peaked at number 37 on the Billboard Hot 100. 
The album did not sell as well as the label had hoped (peaking at number 121 on the Billboard album chart), and she was dropped, never to release another album. She did, however, contribute three songs to soundtrack for The Terminator in 1984. She also recorded demos for a second album in 1985, which were eventually leaked several years later to multiple AOR blogspots.

During the latter half of the 1980s and through the 1990s, McClure starred in more than two dozen sexploitation films. She also played the mother of Elle Woods (Reese Witherspoon) in Legally Blonde (2001) and its sequel, Legally Blonde 2: Red, White & Blonde (2003).

McClure married Gary Arendts on July 17, 2001 and has a daughter Kayla Arendts, born c. 1998.

Discography

Studio albums

Singles

Soundtrack appearances
"You Can't Do That", "Burnin' in the Third Degree", "Photoplay" (from The Terminator) (1984)

Filmography

Crawlspace (1986)
Zombie Death House (1987)
Death Spa (1987)
Commando Squad (1987)
Hot under the Collar (1991)
Bikini Drive-In (1995)
The Heavy Petting Detective (1995)
Midnight Tease II (1995)
Lap Dancing (1995)
Target of Seduction (1995)
Night Visions (1995)
Married People, Single Sex 2: For Better or Worse (1995)
Caged Hearts (1995)
Illicit Dreams 2 (1996)
Bikini Academy (1996)
Sexual Roulette (1996)
Lovers, Liars and Thieves (1996)
Stripshow (1996)
Scorned 2 (1997)
Illicit Dreams 2 (1997) 
Inferno (1997) (also Operation Cobra)
Sweetheart Murders (1998)
Fear and Loathing in Las Vegas (1998)  
Go (1999)
Bare Deception (2000)
Cruel Intentions 2 (2000)
You Shouldn't Kiss Me Like This music video (2000)
Legally Blonde (2001)
Legally Blonde 2: Red, White & Blonde (2003)
Customer of the Week (2005)
Revamped (2007)
Section B (2007)
The Hard Ride (2008)

References

External links

1958 births
American women singers
Actresses from Hawaii
American film actresses
Singers from Hawaii
Living people
21st-century American women